
Gmina Łomianki is an urban-rural gmina (administrative district) in Warsaw West County, Masovian Voivodeship, in east-central Poland.

Villages
Apart from the town of Łomianki, Gmina Łomianki contains the villages and settlements of Dziekanów Bajkowy, Dziekanów Leśny, Dziekanów Nowy, Dziekanów Polski, Kępa Kiełpińska, Kiełpin, Łomianki Chopina, Łomianki Dolne and Sadowa.

Neighbouring gminas
Gmina Łomianki is bordered by the city of Warsaw and by the gminas of Czosnów, Izabelin and Jabłonna.

References

Polish official population figures 2006

Lomianki
Warsaw West County